The 1950 Five Nations Championship was the twenty-first series of the rugby union Five Nations Championship. Including the previous incarnations as the Home Nations and Five Nations, this was the fifty-sixth series of the northern hemisphere rugby union championship. Ten matches were played between 14 January and 25 March. It was contested by England, France, Ireland, Scotland and Wales. Wales won his 11th title, and also the Grand Slam and the Triple Crown.

Participants
The teams involved were:

Table

Results

External links

The official RBS Six Nations Site

Six Nations Championship seasons
Five Nations
Five Nations 
Five Nations
Five Nations
Five Nations
Five Nations
Five Nations
Five Nations
Five Nations